Beaver Run is a tributary of the Tohickon Creek in Milford Township and Richland Township, Bucks County, Pennsylvania in the United States and is part of the Delaware River watershed.

History
Beaver Run was first called Muddy Run as indicated on a draft of a  owned by John Thompson, surveyed by Samuel Foulke on 15 November 1780.

Statistics
Beaver Run was added to the Geographic Names Information System on 2 August 1979 as identification number 1169032. It is listed in the Pennsylvania Gazatteer of Streams as identification number 03185.

Course
Soon, it makes a sharp bend to the left to flow to the north northwest then back to northeast until it receives Licking Run from the left. The stream has an average slope of 12.38 feet per mile (2.11 meters per kilometer).

Geology
Appalachian Highlands Division
Piedmont Province
Gettysburg-Newark Lowland Section
Brunswick Formation
Beaver Run lies in the Brunswick Formation, a sedimentary rock laid down during the Jurassic and the Triassic, consisting of mudstone, siltstone, and green, brown, and reddish-brown shale. Mineralogy includes argillite and hornfels.

Crossings and Bridges

References

Rivers of Bucks County, Pennsylvania
Rivers of Pennsylvania
Tributaries of Tohickon Creek